was a JR East railway station located in the city of Kesennuma, Miyagi Prefecture, Japan. Services have now been replaced by a provisional bus rapid transit line.

Lines
Kurauchi Station was served by the Kesennuma Line, and was located 46.7 rail kilometers from the terminus of the line at Maeyachi Station.

Station layout
Kurauchi Station had one side platform serving a single bi-directional track. The station was unattended.

History
Rikuzen-Koizumi Station opened on 11 December 1977. The station was absorbed into the JR East network upon the privatization of the Japan National Railways (JNR) on April 1, 1987. Operations were discontinued after the 2011 Tōhoku earthquake and tsunami, and rail services have now been replaced by a bus rapid transit line.

Surrounding area
Japan National Route 45

External links

   JR East Station information 
  video of a train trip from Motoyoshi Station to Utatsu Station in 2009, passing through Rikuzen-Koizumi Station, Kurauchi Station, and Rikuzen-Minato Station at around 02:35, 03:55, 05:17 minutes, respectively, without stopping.  Satellite photos (e.g., in Google Maps) showed that large sections of track and railway bridges were severely affected or washed away by the 2011 tsunami.  Motoyoshi Station was undamaged, Rikuzen-Koizumi Station was destroyed, Kurauchi Station was damaged, and Rikuzen-Minato Station was destroyed.

Railway stations in Miyagi Prefecture
Kesennuma Line
Railway stations in Japan opened in 1977
Railway stations closed in 2011
Kesennuma